Sugata is an epithet for Gautama Buddha.

Sugata may also refer to:

 Sugata Bose, Indian historian
 Sugata Marjit, Professor of Industrial Economics
 Sugata Mitra, Professor of Educational Technology
 Sugata Sanyal, Professor of Computer Science
, Japanese composer
, Japanese actor